The Most Illustrious Order of the Perak State Crown (Malay: Darjah Kebesaran Mahkota Negeri Perak Yang Amat Mulia) is knighthood order of the Sultanate of Perak.

Background
It was founded by Sultan Yusuf Izzuddin Shah on 12 December 1957.

Timeline of ribbon

Classes
There are four classes of the order:
Knight Grand Commander	(Dato' Seri Paduka Mahkota Perak,	post-nominal letters : S.P.M.P.)
Knight Commander (Dato' Paduka Mahkota Perak, post-nominal letters : D.P.M.P.)
Commander (Paduka Mahkota Perak, post-nominal letters : P.M.P).
Member	(Ahli Mahkota Perak, post-nominal letters : A.M.P.)

Recipients

Knight Grand Commander (SPMP)
The knight grand commanders receives the title Dato’ Seri and his wife Datin Seri

 1963: Idris Al- Mutawakil Allahi Shah
 1963: Chik Mohd Yusus
 1963: Wan Hamarudin bin Wan Abdul Jalil
 1963: Mohd Razalli bin Mohd Ali Wasi 
 1963: Shahriman bin Raja Abdul Hamid
 1964: Abdul Razak Hussein
 1964: Ahmad Bin Said
 1964: Ahmad Hisham Bin Raja Abdul Malek
 1964: Wan Mohd Razalli Bin Wan Mohd Isa
 1964: Mohd Hashim Bin Jeragan Abdul Shukur
 1965: MUZWIN BT. RAJA ARIFF SHAH
 1965: Raja Musa Ibni
 1965: Meor Abdullah Bin Meor Mohd Jawi
 1966: Raja Ekram
 1966: Mustapha Albakri Bib Hassan
 1966: Osman Talib
 1966: J.E.S. Crawford
 1966: Syed Zahiruddin Syed Hassan
 1967: Hussein Yaacob
 1967: Lau Pak Khuan
 1967: Harvey Peterson
 1969: Raja Azlan Shah
 1970: Jaafar Abdul Raof
 1970: Mohamed Salleh Ismael
 1970: Abdul Aziz Mat Jabar
 1970: Megat Khas Megat Omar
 1970: K.R. Sithambaram Pillai
 1970: Chan Swee Ho
 1974: Mohammed Hanif Omar
 1979: Ahmad Nordin Raja Shahbudin
 1979: Chong Kok Lim
 1979: Yuen Yuet Leng
 1979: Liew Why Hone
 1981: Mohd Khalil Hussein 
 1981: Shaari Shafie
 1985: Mohd Nurzid Mohd Wali
 1989: Ling Liong Sik
 1989: Samy Vellu
 1989: Lim Keng Yaik
 1989: Rafidah Aziz
 1989: Abdul Malik Noordin
 1989: Lee Loy Seng
 1989: Lim Goh Tong
 1989: BORGE BEK-NIELSEN (Honorary)
 1990: Ahmad Sarji Abdul Hamid
 1990: Zain Azraai Zainal Abidin
 1990: Stanley Ho Hung-sun (Honorary)
 2008: Ahmad Zahid Hamidi
 2008: Mohammad Nizar Jamaluddin
 2008: Ismail Shahudin
 2008: Mohd Annuar Zaini
 2008: Ong Ka Chuan
 2008: Selvamany Navachitra Soudamany
 2008: Wan Mohd Isa Wan Ahmad
 2012: Michelle Yeoh Choo Kheng
 2015: Burhanuddin al-Helmy
 2015: Aminuddin Baki
 2015: Hamzah Zainudin
 2015: Arsyad Ayub
 2015: Ranjit Singh Ajit Singh
 2016: Mah Siew Keong
 2016: Zainal Adzam Abdul Ghani
 2016: Wan Mohd Zahid Mohd Nordin
 2017: Mohd Khamil Jamil
 2017: Zainal Rahim Seman
 2017: Nazira Safiya
 2018: Aishah Ong
 2018: Ahmad Faizal Azumu
 2019: Ayop Hashim
 2021: Saarani Mohamad

Knight Commander (DPMP)
The knight commanders receives the title Dato’ and his wife Datin

 1963: Osman Talib
 1963: Mohd Esah Kulop Shah
 1963: Abdul Aziz Mohd Jabar
 1963: Shaari Shafie
 1963: J.E.S. Crawford
 1963: Jal Manecksha
 1963: Shaari Abdul Wahab
 1963: Meor Aliff Bin M Alwi
 1963: Ramly Bin Abdullah
 1963: Mustaffa Al Bakri
 1963: Mohamed Yusof Bin Ahmad
 1963: Liew Why Hone
 1963: Mohd Ali Zaini Bin Mohd Zain
 1963: Leong Kee Nyean
 1963: Lau Pak Khuan
 1963: Shaaribin Haji Abdul Wahab
 1964: Tan Siew Ng
 1964: Syed Zahiruddin Bin Sy Hassan
 1964: Megat Khas Megat Omar
 1964: Muthu Thamby Pillai
 1969: Ishak Mahmud
 1969: Sheikh Abdul Rahman
 1969: Murad Mahmood
 1969: Mohd Sany Abdul Ghaffar
 1978: Richard Ho Ung Hun
 1980: Mak Hon Kam
 1980: Gurmukh Singh
 1980: T. Pathamanathan
 1980: Leong Ah Kow
 1981: Othman Abdul Manan
 1981: S. Dharmalingam
 1981: Hew Sze Tong
 1981: Chuah Yew Aun
 1981: Malik Nordin
 1982: Abdul Malik Noordin
 1982: Ling Liong Sik
 1982: Ng Kuok Thai
 1982: Yaakub Abdul Hamid
 1982: Wong Choo Thong
 1989: Au How Cheong
 1989: Loke Yuen Yow
 1989: S. RAJASEGARAN
 1989: PARAMJIT SINGH A/L TARA SINGH
 1989: Azumu Tak
 1989: Mohd Hamidi Mohd Razali
 1989: Mohd Kharin Ibrahim
 1989: Chan Kai Cheong
 1989: Gurcharan Singh
 1989: Motohiro Otsuka (Honorary)
 1990: Ong Ka Chuan
 1990: MOHAMAD BIN JAMRAH
 1990: ABDUL RAMAN BIN SULAIMAN
 1991: Wan Hashim Wan Teh
 1996: Hamdi Abu Bakar
 2001: Khamsiyah Binti Yeop
 2001: Michelle Yeoh Choo Kheng
 2001: Ho Cheng Wang
 2001: Yik Phooi Hong
 2001: Mat Isa Ismail
 2001: Onn Bin Hamzah
 2001: K. Munisamy
 2001: Hiew Yew Can
 2001: Ahmad Zahid Hamidi
 2001: Raja Abdullah Bin Raja Yaacob
 2001: Ismail Bin Dolah Harun
 2001: Samsudin Bin Hashim
 2001: Kok Soo Chon
 2001: Md Mydin Bin Md Sheriff
 2008: Ngeh Koo Ham
 2009: Mah Hang Soon
 2009: Roshidi Hashim
 2009: Mohd Tarmizi Idris
 2010: Abdul Manaf Hashim
 2010: Rais Hussin Mohamed Ariff
 2011: Sham Mat Sahat

See also 
 Orders, decorations, and medals of the Malaysian states and federal territories#Perak
 Orders, decorations, and medals of Perak
 Order of precedence in Perak
 List of post-nominal letters (Perak)

References 

Orders of chivalry of Malaysia
Orders, decorations, and medals of Perak